The 2004–2005 Coca-Cola Tigers season was the third season of the franchise in the Philippine Basketball Association (PBA).

Draft picks

Occurrences
Coach Eric Altamirano became the new head coach of Coca-Cola starting the 2005 PBA Fiesta Conference, taking over from Chot Reyes, who was assigned to coach the national team, Altamirano handled the Purefoods Tender Juicy Hotdogs in 2002 before he was called to serve the national team in the Busan Asian Games.

Roster

Philippine Cup

Game log

|- bgcolor="#bbffbb"
| 1
| October 6
| Shell
| 91-83
| David (20)
| 
| 
| Araneta Coliseum
| 1–0
|- bgcolor="#edbebf"
| 2
| October 10
| Purefoods
| 76–78
| Hatfield (17) 
| 
| 
| Araneta Coliseum
| 1–1
|- bgcolor="#bbffbb"
| 3
| October 14
| Alaska
| 71-68
| Hatfield (16)
| 
| 
| Butuan
| 2–1
|- bgcolor="#bbffbb"
| 4
| October 17
| San Miguel
| 92-84
| Cariaso (20)
| 
| 
| Araneta Coliseum
| 3–1 
|- bgcolor="#edbebf"
| 5
| October 22
| Talk 'N Text
| 77–96
| Juinio (20) 
| 
| 
| Philsports Arena
| 3–2
|- bgcolor="#bbffbb"
| 6
| October 27
| FedEx
| 84-67
| Reavis (19)
| 
| 
| Araneta Coliseum
| 4–2

|- bgcolor="#bbffbb"
| 10
| November 17
| Red Bull
| 101-88
| 
| 
| 
| Araneta Coliseum
| 5–5

|-bgcolor="#edbebf"
| 14
| December 2
| Purefoods
| 76–82
| Peek (19)
| 
| 
| Lipa City
| 5–9
|-bgcolor="#bbffbb"
| 15
| December 5
| Talk 'N Text
| 93-81
| Avenido (17)
| 
| 
| Araneta Coliseum
| 6–9
|-bgcolor="#bbffbb"
| 16
| December 12
| Red Bull
| 102-96 
| Peek (28)
| 
| 
| Araneta Coliseum
| 7–9
|-bgcolor="#edbebf"
| 17
| December 16
| San Miguel
| 75–80
| Wainwright (17)
| 
| 
| Dagupan
| 7–10

|-bgcolor="#bbffbb"
| 18
| January 5
| FedEx
| 104–97
| Arigo (35)
| 
| 
| Philsports Arena
| 8–10

Transactions

Trades

Additions

Subtractions

Recruited imports

GP – Games played

References

Powerade Tigers seasons
Coca-Cola